Roz Kaveney (born 9 July 1949) is a British writer, critic, and poet, best known for her critical works about pop culture and for being a core member of the Midnight Rose collective. Kaveney's works include fiction and non-fiction, poetry, reviewing, and editing. Kaveney is also a transgender rights activist. She has contributed to several newspapers such as The Independent and The Guardian. She is also a founding member of Feminists Against Censorship and a former deputy chair of Liberty. She was deputy editor of the transgender-related magazine META.

Early life and transition

Kaveney attended Pembroke College, Oxford, where she participated in a poetry group that had a particular interest in Martian poetry and shared a flat with Christopher Reid. Kaveney is a transgender woman, who began transition in her last year at Oxford. After being "persuaded to desist by feminist friends", Kaveney delayed her transition for several years. She eventually transitioned around 1978.

Literary career 
Kaveney gave up poetry in her twenties, not resuming until reaching 50. Kaveney's poetry was originally written in a rhythmic free verse, although her work later shifted into formalism. Kaveney cites a number of bereavements as the trigger for returning to poetry. Speaking to PinkNews, she said: "When my friend Mike Ford died, suddenly and tragically, I organised a memorial meeting for him and wrote a poem for it completely out of the blue.”

Dialectic of the Flesh was shortlisted for the Lambda Award; Rituals - Rhapsody of Blood, Volume One was short-listed for the Crawford Award, and made the Honor Roll for the Tiptree Award.

Kaveney's first novel, Tiny Pieces of Skull, was published in 2015 by Team Angelica Press, 27 years after she wrote it.

A contributor to The Times Literary Supplement (24 July 2015) reviewed Tiny Pieces of Skull, describing the book as a work which "deserves to be recognised as a seminal fictional work on transgender identity and transphobia... hilarious and chilling". It won the 2016 Best Trans Fiction Lambda Literary Award.

Other work 
In 1988, Kaveney made an extended appearance on the television discussion After Dark with among others Andrea Dworkin and Anthony Burgess. Kaveney wrote later:

In 2021 Kaveney appeared in the documentary Rebel Dykes, which explores the history of a radical lesbian subculture in 1980s London, England.

Creative influences 
Kaveney has cited Marilyn Hacker, Thomas M. Disch, and Samuel R. Delany among her literary influences.

Bibliography
Tales from the Forbidden Planet (1987) (editor)
More Tales from the Forbidden Planet (1990) (editor)
Temps (1991) (short story: "A Lonely Impulse)
Eurotemps (1992) (novella: "Totally Trashed")
The Weerde: The Book of the Ancients Book 2 (1993, co-editor and contributor)
Reading the Vampire Slayer - The New, Updated Unofficial Guide to Buffy and Angel (2001)  
From Alien to the Matrix: Reading Science Fiction Film (2005)
Superheroes!: Capes and Crusaders in Comics and Films (2006)  
Teen Dreams: Reading Teen Film and Television from 'Heathers' to 'Veronica Mars''' (2006)Battlestar Galactica: Investigating Flesh, Spirit, and Steel (2010)
 Introduction to Scratch Monkey by Charles Stross (1993, introduction 2011)Nip/Tuck: Television That Gets Under Your Skin (2011)Tales from the House Band, Volume 1: A Plus One Music Anthology (2011)Rituals, Rhapsody of Blood, Volume One (2012)Dialectic of the Flesh (2012)What If What's Imagined Were All True (2012)Reflections, Rhapsody of Blood Volume Two (2013)Resurrections, Rhapsody of Blood Volume Three (2014)Tiny Pieces of Skull (2015)Realities, Rhapsody of Blood Volume Four (2018)Catullus (2018)Queer: LGBTQ Writing from Ancient Times to Yesterday (2021)Selected Poems: 2009-2021 (2021)The Great Good Time'' (2022)

References

External links

Official website

SF Encyclopaedia Entry
 Meta Magazine launch announcement 

1949 births
Living people
20th-century British novelists
20th-century British women writers
21st-century British novelists
21st-century British women writers
Alumni of Pembroke College, Oxford
British agnostics
British book editors
British fantasy writers
British film critics
British journalists
British poets
British science fiction writers
British women novelists
British LGBT novelists
British LGBT poets
Lambda Literary Award winners
Science fiction editors
Transfeminists
Transgender women
Transgender writers
Transgender rights activists
British women film critics
Women science fiction and fantasy writers